Stovepipe Wells Airport  is a public airport located one mile (1.6 km) west of Death Valley National Park, serving Inyo County, California, USA. The airport covers 10 acres  (4.05 ha) and has one runway.

In 2020, the park proposed closing the airport as part of a redevelopment of the Stovepipe Wells area.

References

External links 

 Stovepipe Wells Airport Pictures taken at and near the Stovepipe Wells Airport

Airports in Inyo County, California
Buildings and structures in Death Valley National Park